Royce Lionel Smith (June 17, 1949 – January 22, 2004) was a professional American football guard who was selected by the New Orleans Saints in the first round (8th overall) of the 1972 NFL Draft. He played in the National Football League for 5 seasons. He appeared in most games during these seasons but was unable to force his way into the starting lineup.

References

External links
 NFL.com player page
 Pro-Football-Reference.com Royce Smith

1949 births
2004 deaths
All-American college football players
American football offensive guards
Atlanta Falcons players
Georgia Bulldogs football players
New Orleans Saints players
Players of American football from Savannah, Georgia